Madame Claude is a 2021 biographical film created and released by Netflix about the infamous French brothel-keeper Madame Claude.

Plot
Madame Claude is the owner of a popular brothel in the late 1960s Paris, and has knowledge that gives her incredible power and influence over French politicians and underworld figures. The arrival of an affluent and well-connected young woman threatens to undermine everything.

Cast
Karole Rocher as Madame Claude
Roschdy Zem as 
Garance Marillier as Sidonie
Pierre Deladonchamps as Serge
Hafsia Herzi as Nadège
Mylène Jampanoï as Yoshiro

Production
The film is directed by Sylvie Verheyde.

Release
The film premiered globally on Netflix on April 2, 2021.

Reception

References

External links
 
 

2021 films
2020s French-language films
2021 biographical drama films
French biographical drama films
French-language Netflix original films
Films about prostitution in Paris
Films set in the 1960s
Films not released in theaters due to the COVID-19 pandemic
Films directed by Sylvie Verheyde
2020s French films